Kary Lamont Vincent Jr. (born February 27, 1999) is an American football cornerback for the Houston Roughnecks of the XFL. He played college football at LSU before he was drafted by the Denver Broncos in the seventh round of the 2021 NFL Draft.

Early life and high school
Vincent grew up in Port Arthur, Texas and attended Memorial High School. As a senior, he was named first-team All-USA Texas after intercepting seven passes, four of which he returned for touchdowns.

College career
As a true freshman, Vincent played in 11 games with nine tackles and one interception. He had 31 tackles, one sack, six passes deflected and one interception in his sophomore season. As a junior, he had 48 tackles with nine pass defended with four interceptions as LSU won the 2019 National Championship. Vincent announced that he would opt out of the 2020 season in order to prepare for the 2021 NFL Draft.

Vincent is also a sprinter on the LSU track team. He competed at the 2019 NCAA Division I Outdoor Track and Field Championships in the 4 x 100-meter relay.

Professional career

Denver Broncos
Vincent was drafted by the Denver Broncos in the seventh round, 237th overall, of the 2021 NFL Draft. On May 12, 2021, Vincent officially signed with the Broncos.

Philadelphia Eagles
On November 2, 2021, Vincent was traded to the Philadelphia Eagles in exchange for a sixth round pick in the 2022 NFL Draft. He was waived on August 30, 2022.

San Francisco 49ers
On September 14, 2022, Vincent signed with the practice squad of the San Francisco 49ers. He was released on September 21.

San Antonio Brahmas 
On November 17, 2022, Vincent was drafted by the San Antonio Brahmas of the XFL.

Houston Roughnecks 
On January 23, 2023, Vincent was traded to the Houston Roughnecks in exchange for wide receiver Darece Roberson Jr.

Personal life
Vincent's father, Kary Vincent, played college football at Texas A&M and in the Arena Football League. The elder Kary Vincent died in 2018.

References

External links
LSU Tigers bio

1999 births
Living people
Denver Broncos players
African-American players of American football
American football safeties
LSU Tigers football players
LSU Tigers track and field athletes
Players of American football from Houston
San Antonio Brahmas players
Houston Roughnecks players
San Francisco 49ers players
Track and field athletes from Houston
American football cornerbacks
21st-century African-American sportspeople
Philadelphia Eagles players